The Venezuelan U-17 women's national football team are the national women's under-17 soccer team of Venezuela. They are controlled by the Federación Venezolana de Fútbol. They have been champions twice, in the 2013 South American Under-17 Women's Championship and 2016 South American Under-17 Women's Football Championship. The Venezuelan U-17 women's national football team, is the only Conmebol's national team of the category, that have qualified to FIFA U-17 Women's World Cup's semifinals.

Competitive record

FIFA U-17 Women's World Cup

South American Championship record

Current squad

Previous squads
2010 FIFA U-17 Women's World Cup
2014 FIFA U-17 Women's World Cup
2016 FIFA U-17 Women's World Cup

See also
 Venezuela women's national football team (Senior)
 Football in Venezuela

References

External links
 Venezuela Football Association Website

F
u-17 National
Women's national under-17 association football teams